Christine "Tina" Kotek (born September 30, 1966) is an American politician serving as the 39th governor of Oregon since 2023. A member of the Democratic Party, Kotek served eight terms as the state representative from the 44th district of the Oregon House of Representatives from 2007 to 2022, as majority leader of the Oregon House of Representatives from 2011 to 2013, and as Speaker of the Oregon House of Representatives from 2013 to 2022. She won the 2022 Oregon gubernatorial election, defeating Republican nominee Christine Drazan and independent candidate Betsy Johnson.

As an openly lesbian woman, Kotek has made history several times through her electoral success. She became the first openly lesbian woman elected speaker of a U.S. state house in 2013, and was the longest-serving Speaker of the Oregon House of Representatives. In 2022, she became one of the first two openly lesbian women (alongside Maura Healey) and the co-third openly LGBT person (alongside Healey and after Kate Brown and Jared Polis) elected governor of a U.S. state, as well as the third woman elected governor of Oregon (after Barbara Roberts and Brown).

Early life and education
Christine "Tina" Kotek was born on September 30, 1966, in York, Pennsylvania, to Jerry Albert Kotek and Florence (née Matich). Her father was of Czech ancestry and her mother's parents were Slovenes. Her grandfather František Kotek was a baker from Týnec nad Labem.

Kotek graduated second in her class from Dallastown Area High School. She attended Georgetown University, but left without graduating. She then worked in commercial diving and as a travel agent.

In 1987, Kotek moved to Oregon. She earned a Bachelor of Science degree in religious studies from the University of Oregon in 1990. She then studied at the University of Washington, earning a master's degree in international studies and comparative religion.

Career 
Before being elected to office, Kotek worked as a public policy advocate for the Oregon Food Bank and then as policy director of Children First for Oregon. She co-chaired the Human Services Coalition of Oregon during the 2002 budget crisis and co-chaired the Governor's Medicaid Advisory Committee.

Oregon House of Representatives

Elections
In 2004, Kotek lost the Democratic primary for Oregon House District 43. In 2006, she won a three-way Democratic primary for Oregon House District 44, which includes North and Northeast Portland. In the general election, she defeated her Republican opponent with nearly 80% of the vote.

Kotek ran unopposed for reelection in 2008. In 2010, she faced a Democratic primary challenge but won over 85% of the vote. Kotek won the 2010 general election with almost 81% of the vote. She was reelected every two years through 2020.

Pre-speakership House career
Kotek rose in the House leadership, serving as the Democratic whip in the 2009 legislative session. In the 2011 session, she was co-speaker pro tempore with Republican Andy Olson due to the House's 30–30 partisan split.

In June 2011, the House Democratic Caucus chose Kotek as its leader (succeeding Dave Hunt).

Speakership
After Democrats won a House majority in the 2012 election, they nominated Kotek for speaker of the House for the 2013 legislative session. She was elected to the position, becoming the first out lesbian in the nation to serve as a legislative speaker. She was reelected for in 2015, 2017, 2019, and 2021. She is Oregon's longest-serving speaker of the House.

In December 2016, Kotek became the chair of the board of directors of the Democratic Legislative Campaign Committee. She left the post in July 2019.

In 2020, Republicans worked with Democrats to redraw the districts following the 2020 U.S. census with equal representation from the Democratic and Republican parties as a compromise to have the Republicans stop the use of quorum rule restrictions to stall legislation. Kotek later reversed her decision and restored the Democratic majority on the committee redrawing the congressional districts.

In January 2022, Kotek announced her resignation from the House to focus on her campaign. She was succeeded as speaker by Dan Rayfield and in the 44th district by Travis Nelson.

Governor of Oregon

2022 gubernatorial campaign
On September 1, 2021, Kotek declared her candidacy in the 2022 Oregon gubernatorial election. Her main opponent in the Democratic primary was State Treasurer Tobias Read. She won the Democratic primary on May 17, 2022.

In the general election, Kotek's main opponents were Republican nominee and former state representative Christine Drazan and unaffiliated candidate and former state senator Betsy Johnson. The election was on November 8. As of November 10, The Oregonian, Willamette Week, and Oregon Public Broadcasting had declared Kotek the likely winner of the race with 73% of ballots counted.

Tenure 
Kotek was sworn in on January 9, 2023. On her first day in office, she declared a state of emergency due to homelessness.

Personal life 
Kotek and her wife, Aimee Wilson, met in 2005 and married in a private ceremony in 2017. They have lived together in Portland's Kenton neighborhood since 2005.

Kotek was one of the Oregon Legislative Assembly's only openly LGBTQ+ members and the first lesbian speaker of a state house.

Kotek considers herself a lapsed Catholic and attends an Episcopal church.

Electoral history

Governor of Oregon

See also
 List of female speakers of legislatures in the United States
 List of LGBT people from Portland, Oregon

References

External links

 Office of Oregon Governor Government website.
 Tina Kotek for Oregon campaign website
 

|-

|-

|-

 
|-

|-

|-

|-

 

 

1966 births
21st-century American politicians
21st-century American women politicians
21st-century LGBT people
American people of Czech descent
American people of Slovenian descent
Converts to Protestantism from Roman Catholicism
Democratic Party governors of Oregon
Lesbian politicians
LGBT state governors of the United States
LGBT state legislators in Oregon
Living people
People from Dallastown, Pennsylvania
Politicians from Portland, Oregon
Politicians from York, Pennsylvania
Speakers of the Oregon House of Representatives
Democratic Party members of the Oregon House of Representatives
University of Oregon alumni
University of Washington alumni
Women legislative speakers
Women state legislators in Oregon
Women state governors of the United States